John Watt (16 February 1858 – 14 November 1914) was an Australian cricketer. He played three first-class matches for Tasmania between 1893 and 1896. His son, John Charles Watt, also played first-class cricket for Tasmania.

See also
 List of Tasmanian representative cricketers

References

External links
 

1858 births
1914 deaths
Australian cricketers
Tasmania cricketers
Cricketers from Hobart